Pirogan is a surname. Notable people with the surname include:

Ştefan Pirogan (died 1944), Romanian politician
Vadim Pirogan (1921–2007), Bessarabian activist and author